Robin Ward  (born 1966) is a British Anglican priest. Since 2006, he has served as principal of St Stephen's House, Oxford, an Anglo-Catholic theological college in England.

Early life and education
Ward studied at Magdalen College, Oxford, graduating with a Bachelor of Arts (BA) in 1987; as per tradition, his BA was promoted to a Master of Arts (MA Oxon) degree in 1991. From 1988 to 1991, he trained for holy orders at St Stephen's House, Oxford. He obtained a Doctor of Philosophy (PhD) degree from King's College London, completing it in 2003 with a doctoral thesis titled "The Schism at Antioch in the Fourth Century".

Ordained ministry
Ward was ordained deacon in 1991 and priest in 1992. He served as assistant curate of St Andrew's Romford from 1991 to 1994 and of St Andrew's and St Francis of Assisi's Willesden Green from 1994 to 1996. He was the vicar of St John the Baptist's Sevenoaks from 1996 until 2006 and the chaplain of the Invicta Community Care NHS Trust from 1997 until 2006. He was made an honorary canon of Rochester Cathedral in 2004. On 1 September 2006 he became the principal of St Stephen's House, Oxford.

Ward represented the Diocese of Rochester in the General Synod of the Church of England. He was a member of the Revision Committee on Ordination Services and a representative of the Catholic Group. He is a member of the Society of the Holy Cross (SSC).

Personal life
Ward married Ruth in 1996. Together they have two sons.

Arms

Selected works
Ward, R. On Christian Priesthood (London 2011), 
Ward, R. Building Disciplined Lives of Regular Prayer, Study and Worship
Ward, R. Review of Herbert McCabe, The Good Life: Ethics and the pursuit of happiness
Ward, R. 'God is Gone Up', Church Times Issue 7416 (29 April 2005)

References

Sources and further information
Appointments, Church Times Issue 7400 (7 January 2005)
University of Oxford Annual Review 2005/06
New appointments: Principal of St Stephen's House, Oxford Blueprint: The newsletter of the University of Oxford 6:12 (29 June 2006)
Staff at St Stephen's House
St Stephen's House welcomes new Principal
Ordination of women in the Anglican Communion and other Churches (as at February 2004)
General Synod: Ordination Services: Revision Committee
'Schooling in faith: Oxford’s theological colleges look to the future', the Door (1 September 2006)
Crockford's Clerical Directory (97th edn, London: Church House Publishing, 2001), p. 788

1966 births
Living people
Alumni of Magdalen College, Oxford
Alumni of St Stephen's House, Oxford
Alumni of King's College London
British theologians
Religion academics
21st-century English Anglican priests
Principals of St Stephen's House, Oxford